Acinetobacter soli is a Gram-negative, catalase-positive, oxidase-negative, strictly aerobic rod-shaped, nonmotile bacterium from the genus Acinetobacter isolated from forest soil at Mt. Baekwoon in the Republic of Korea.
. Acinetobacter soli can cause bloodstream infection in neonates.

References

External links
Type strain of Acinetobacter soli at BacDive -  the Bacterial Diversity Metadatabase

Moraxellaceae
Bacteria described in 2009